Patricio Nazario "Pato" Yáñez Candia (born January 20, 1961 in Valparaíso) is a retired football player from Chile, who obtained 43 caps for his national team, scoring five goals. He made his debut on June 13, 1979 in a friendly against Ecuador, replacing Jorge Neumann, and had his last match on November 16, 1994 against Argentina. He played for his native country in the 1982 FIFA World Cup.

El Pato Yáñez incident 

In 1989, during the infamous incident involving the goalkeeper Roberto Rojas in a match against Brazil, Yáñez, under the frustration of believing his team was subject to unfairness, performed a gesture to the Brazilian fans by holding his genitals with both of his hands and his middle body slightly bent towards the front in an act of sexual intercourse. The moment was captured by Chilean national television, and as years have passed, the offensive gesture, when repeated or remembered, is known as "Pato Yáñez".

Post retirement
Following his retirement from football, Yáñez has mainly worked in TV and radio media as a football commentator. Also, he has worked for the international channels Fox Sports Chile,  and ESPN Chile. In radio media he has worked for Radio Agricultura and Radio Bío-Bío.

Honours

Club
San Luis
 Copa Apertura Segunda División (1): 
 Chilean Segunda División (1): 1980

Real Valladolid
 Copa de la Liga (1): 1984

Colo-Colo
 Chilean Primera División (2): 1991, 1993
 Copa Chile (1): 1994
 Copa Libertadores (1): 1991
 Recopa Sudamericana (1): 1992

International
Chile
  (1):

References

External links
 

1961 births
Living people
Sportspeople from Valparaíso
Chilean footballers
Chilean expatriate footballers
Chilean expatriate sportspeople in Spain
Expatriate footballers in Spain
Chile international footballers
Primera B de Chile players
Chilean Primera División players
San Luis de Quillota footballers
Universidad de Chile footballers
Colo-Colo footballers
La Liga players
Real Valladolid players
Real Zaragoza players
Real Betis players
Association football forwards
1982 FIFA World Cup players
1979 Copa América players
1989 Copa América players
1991 Copa América players
Copa Libertadores-winning players
Chilean association football commentators
Televisión Nacional de Chile color commentators
Chilevisión color commentators
Canal del Fútbol color commentators
Chilean radio personalities